Gigil (stylized as GIGIL) is a Philippine advertising agency based in Bonifacio Global City in Taguig, Philippines.

Background
Gigil was founded by Badong Abesamis, Herbert Hernandez and Isabel Prollamante. The group considered naming their agency "No Plan B" or "Toyo" but decided to adopt Abesamis' proposal "Gigil" to reflect the agency's vision of "passion" or hard work. Gigil was officially launched in October 2017.

Gigil has commissioned works for numerous brands such as 7-Eleven, Globe, Jollibee, Levi's, Netflix, Procter & Gamble, RC Cola, Unilever, and Vivo, among others.

Gigil was named by Campaign as the Philippines Independent Agency of the Year and the Philippines Creative Agency of the Year for 2020.

Gigil was named by Ad Age as International Small Agency of the Year for 2021.

In January 2023, Gigil announced its expansion to the U.S. and Canada by opening offices in Los Angeles, New York, and Toronto.

Notable campaigns
Gigil's SHOP2GIVE campaign in 2018 for Unilever was awarded by Lazada as the Best Marketing Innovation 2018 and also won an award for Best Campaign Execution at the Lazada Philippines Lazada Awards. It also won a gold award for Advocacy and a silver award for Responsible Citizenship at the 2019 Tambuli Awards and a bronze award for the E-commerce category at the 2019 ADFEST Awards. Within the same year, Gigil's Dr. Internet campaign in for Konsulta MD won a bronze award for the Healthcare category at the 2018 Spikes Asia Awards and a bronze award for the Digital Craft category at the 2018 Boomerang Awards. It also won two gold awards for Creative Storytelling and for Film Craft: Best Copywriting, and a bronze for Creative Effectiveness: Film at the 2019 Kidlat Awards. 

The agency's Studs campaign in 2019 for Levi's Philippines won a silver award for Fashion & Beauty at the 2019 Clio Awards. It also won a bronze award for Creative Effectiveness at the 2019 Kidlat Awards, two bronze awards for Brand Storytelling and Seasons Celebration at the Asia Pacific Tambuli Awards, two silver awards for Effectiveness at the 2019 Boomerang Awards, and a gold award for the Retail category at the 2020 Asia Pacific Effie Awards, making Gigil the first independent agency from the Philippines to win an Effie gold. 

The agency's Basta campaign in 2020 for RC Cola, which featured a boy confronting his mother if he is adopted due to glasses embedded on his back, won a bronze award for Film at the Cannes Lion 2021. It also won a bronze award at the 2021 Asia Pacific Effie Awards for the Youth Marketing category, a silver award at the 2022 Asia Pacific Effie Awards for the Beverages, Non-Alcohol category and the Short Video Marketing category, and a bronze award for Film at the 2022 Clio Awards.

The agency did a marketing campaign for the Philippine Netflix animated series Trese in 2021. Within the same year, Gigil also did the Pandemic Effect campaign for the Belo Medical Group. The ad featuring a woman gaining weight, growing body hair, and getting acne while watching a stream of bad news amidst the COVID-19 pandemic received negative reception, which led to the pull-out of the ad and the issuance of an apology from both Gigil and the Belo Medical Group. The Association of Accredited Advertising Agencies of the Philippines suspended Gigil's association membership as a result.

The agency's Party campaign in 2022 for Cheers, won a bronze award for Film at the Cannes Lion 2022.

References

2017 establishments in the Philippines
Advertising agencies of the Philippines
Companies based in Taguig